Lafuma is a French company that specializes in outdoor equipment and clothing, such as backpacks, sleeping bags and footwear. It also offers a wide variety of other equipment, earning comparisons to United States companies such as Patagonia and Columbia Sportswear. Group brands include Eider, Millet and Oxbow. The Lafuma clothing brands have been personified by sports personalities and by the French actor and stuntman Karl E. Landler.

History
The three Lafuma brothers – Victor, Alfred and Gabriel – founded Lafuma in 1930 producing backpacks. In 1936, the company invented the metal-frame braced backpack, which expanded the group considerably. Having produced products for both the French Army before World War II and during the occupation of France by Nazi Germany for the Wehrmacht, the company resumed production post-war. In 1954, Lafuma expanded into camping furniture.

In 1984, the company went bankrupt, and was taken over by a grandson of the founders, Philippe Joffard. In 1985, the company expanded into sleeping bags and, in 1986, moved part of its production to Tunisia. In 1991, the company launched new clothing brands and, in 1992, opened production facilities in Hungary. This allowed the resumption of the production of the Millet and Le Chameau brands in 1995.

The company was launched on the CAC Small second market in 1997, reducing the founding families' share to around a 15% share holding. Philippe Joffard remains chairman.

In 2004, the company purchased the jeans brand Ober and, in 2005, Oxbow. In 2006, the company began co-branding winter clothing with Thierry Mugler. After a difficult year in 2007, Lafuma resumed production of the Eider brand, but by moving production from Éloise to overseas facilities.

In 2012, Le Chameau was sold to Marwyn Management Partners, a UK-based private equity company.

Current
The group is still highly reliant on the domestic French market, with 60% of group turnover generated from French sales. The current brands of the group include (with reported sales percentages):
Lafuma (44.1%)
Oxbow Surfwear (28.2%)
Millet (16.3%)

Detailed figures for the licensing of the Killy trademark are not published. Turnover by product is broken down as:
Clothing (62.5%)
Accessories and equipment (12%) including: backpacks, sleeping bags, blankets, billfolds, mountaineering ropes, strollers
Shoes and boots (13.1%)
Camping furniture (12.4%) including: folding chairs, chairs, tables

The group has eight production sites, in: France (4), Hungary (1), Tunisia (1), Morocco (1) and China (1).

References

External links

 Lafuma's official website in English
 Lafuma's official website in French

Clothing companies established in 1930
Manufacturing companies based in Paris
Companies based in Auvergne-Rhône-Alpes
Climbing and mountaineering equipment companies
Manufacturing companies established in 1930
French companies established in 1930
French brands